Surgan-e Sofla (also Romanized as Sūrgān-e Soflá; also known as Sūrgāvan-e Soflá) is a village in Nehzatabad Rural District, in the Central District of Rudbar-e Jonubi County, Kerman Province, Iran. At the 2006 census, its population was 128, in 23 families.

References 

Populated places in Rudbar-e Jonubi County